"I'll Take the Rain" is the third and final single from American rock band R.E.M.'s 12th studio album, Reveal (2001). Released on November 19, 2001, the song reached number 44 on the UK Singles Chart but failed to chart on the US Billboard Hot 100.

The single's music video, directed by David Weir, represented the first time the band has released an entirely animated music video. The clip is suitably moody to match the pace of the song, and follows the adventures of a crown-bearing dog and a living wooden cart (shown on the single cover) as they explore an island.

The song was included on the album r.e.m.IX and also performed on MTV Unplugged in 2001.

Track listings
All songs were written by Peter Buck, Mike Mills, and Michael Stipe.

UK CD1 (W573CD)
 "I'll Take the Rain" - 5:55
 "I've Been High" (Live) - 3:201
 "She Just Wants to Be" (Live) - 5:062

UK CD2 (W573CDX)
 "I'll Take the Rain" - 5:55
 "32 Chord Song" - 3:12 3
 "I've Been High" (Live) (enhanced video)1

European CD (9362-42416-2)
 "I'll Take the Rain"
 "32 Chord Song" - 3:12
 "She Just Wants to Be" (Live) - 5:06
 "I've Been High" (Live) - 3:20
 "I've Been High" (Live) (enhanced video)

Notes
1 Recorded at Channel V Studios, Sydney, Australia; May 31, 2001.
2 Recorded at the Museum of Television and Radio, New York City, New York; May 18, 2001.
3 Alternative version of "Summer Turns to High" from Reveal.

Charts

References

R.E.M. songs
2001 singles
2001 songs
Song recordings produced by Michael Stipe
Song recordings produced by Mike Mills
Song recordings produced by Pat McCarthy (record producer)
Song recordings produced by Peter Buck
Songs written by Michael Stipe
Songs written by Mike Mills
Songs written by Peter Buck
Warner Records singles